Volleyball events were contested at the 1967 Summer Universiade in Tokyo, Japan.

References
 Universiade volleyball medalists on HickokSports

U
1967 Summer Universiade
Volleyball at the Summer Universiade